Shorea beccariana is a tree in the family Dipterocarpaceae, native to Borneo. It is named for the Italian botanist Odoardo Beccari.

Description
The bark is generally smooth.

Distribution and habitat
Shorea beccariana is endemic to Borneo.

References

beccariana
Endemic flora of Borneo
Plants described in 1887
Taxa named by William Burck